The 1987 All-Ireland Senior Camogie Championship Final was the 51st All-Ireland Final and the deciding match of the 1987 All-Ireland Senior Camogie Championship, an inter-county camogie tournament for the top teams in Ireland.

Again, the final was dominated by the Downey sisters, and Kilkenny won by ten points.

References

All-Ireland Senior Camogie Championship Finals
All-Ireland Senior Camogie Championship Final
All-Ireland Senior Camogie Championship Final
All-Ireland Senior Camogie Championship Final, 1987